Ezio Fiori (born 25 October 1949) is an Italian bobsledder. He competed in the two man and the four man events at the 1976 Winter Olympics.

References

External links
 

1949 births
Living people
Italian male bobsledders
Olympic bobsledders of Italy
Bobsledders at the 1976 Winter Olympics
Sportspeople from the Province of Belluno